Sera Naiqama (born 26 July 1995) is an Australian rugby union player.

Background 
Naiqama is the younger sister of NRL and Fijian rugby league internationals Kevin and Wes Naiqama.

Rugby career

2019 
Naiqama played for Australia A against the Black Ferns Development team at the Oceania Rugby Women's Championship in Fiji.

2022 
Naiqama made her test debut for Australia on 6 May against Fiji. She came off the bench in the Wallaroos test match against Japan four days later.

Naiqama was named in Australia's squad for the Pacific Four Series in New Zealand. She was named in the Wallaroos squad for a two-test series against the Black Ferns at the Laurie O'Reilly Cup. She was selected in the team again for the delayed Rugby World Cup in New Zealand.

2023 
Naiqama signed with Matatū for the 2023 Super Rugby Aupiki season.

References

External links
Wallaroos Profile

1995 births
Living people
Australia women's international rugby union players
Australian female rugby union players
Australian people of I-Taukei Fijian descent